This is a list of notable Barbadian Americans, including both original immigrants who obtained American citizenship and their American descendants.

Actors

 Meagan Good - actress (paternal grandfather) 
 Cuba Gooding, Jr. - actor (paternal grandfather was from Barbados)
 Omar Gooding - actor (same grandfather as Cuba Jr.)
 Adrian Holmes - Canadian actor (ancestry vague)
 Nia Long - actress (ancestry vague)
 Mari Morrow - actress (ancestry vague)
 Gwyneth Paltrow - (her great-grandmother was Barbadian) 
 Redd Pepper - (born Richard Green in Barbados)
 Jada Pinkett Smith - actress (ancestry vague on mother's side)
 Robert Christopher Riley - actor (father from Barbados)
 Lamman Rucker - (ancestry vague)

Entertainers
 Lene Hall - supermodel
 Norma Miller - dancer (both parents from Barbados)

Musicians

Rihanna - full name Robyn Rihanna Fenty
Tory Lanez - rapper
A$AP Rocky - real name Rakim Mayers, rapper
Afrika Bambaataa - musician
Damon Dash - co-founder of Roc-A-Fella Records; Stacey Dash's cousin
Grandmaster Flash - hip hop musician and DJ
Dave East - rapper
Faith Evans - singer and actress
Doug E. Fresh - hip hop musician
Desiigner - hip hop musician/rapper
Cuba Gooding, Sr. - singer
Ryan Leslie - musician, producer
Mr. Lif - hip hop musician
LL Cool J - musician
Lord Burgess - songwriter
Shontelle - musician
Arturo Tappin - musician
Tweet - real name Charlene Keys, singer
Rayvon - real name Bruce Alexander Michael Brewster, Barbadian singer-songwriter
Remy Ma - rapper
Rowdy Rebel - rapper
Lil’ Kim - rapper

Public service figures 

 Shirley Chisholm - Congresswoman
 Adrian Fenty - former Mayor of Washington, District of Columbia
 Charles Gittens - first black United States Secret Service agent
 Sylvia O. Hinds-Radix - New York State Supreme Court Judge
 Eric Holder - former Attorney General of the United States
 Sherrilyn Ifill - lawyer and activist
 Thomas Jones - former Civil Court judge and civil rights activist in Brooklyn, New York
 Chirlane McCray - poet, public speech writer, married to New York City Mayor, Bill de Blasio
 Bret Schundler - former Mayor of Jersey City, NJ
 Lloyd Sealy - first African American NYPD officer to command a police precinct and patrol borough
 Dennis M. Walcott - Deputy Mayor for Education and Community Development in New York City, New York

Religious figures
 Arnold Josiah Ford - rabbi

Scientists
 Cardinal Warde - physicist, full professor of Electrical Engineering and Computer Science at the Massachusetts Institute of Technology

Sports Figures

 Robert Bailey - National Football League player
 Anson Carter - Canadian hockey player
 Andre De Grasse - Canadian Sprinter
 Ramon Harewood - National Football League player
 Orlando Jordan - professional wrestler
 Winston Justice - National Football League player
 Sam Seale - National Football League player
 Alana Shipp - American/Israeli IFBB professional bodybuilder
 Christian Taylor - track and field athlete
 Obadele Thompson - track and field athlete
 Kevin Weekes - Canadian hockey player
 Andrew Wiggins - Canadian basketball player
Nick Wiggins - Canadian basketball player

Writers

 Gwen Ifill - American journalist and television newscaster
 Agymah Kamau - novelist
 Odimumba Kwamdela - poet and novelist
 Paule Marshall - novelist
 Susan L. Taylor -  editor-in-chief of Essence magazine

Others
 Frank L. White - chef, the original chef's face on Cream of Wheat box

See also
 List of Barbadians
 List of Barbadian Britons
 Barbadian Canadians

References

Lists of American people by ethnic or national origin
Americans
Barbadian